Glazebrook railway station serves the villages in the civil parish of Rixton-with-Glazebrook in the Warrington unitary authority in the ceremonial county of Cheshire, England. The station, and all trains serving it, are operated by Northern Trains.

History

Glazebrook station was formerly located between two junctions, Glazebrook West for the Wigan Junction Railways to Wigan Central and St Helens Central (GCR), services to those stations ceasing in 1952 (St Helen's Central) and 1964 (Wigan Central); and Glazebrook East Junction for the line to Stockport Tiviot Dale via Skelton Junction, passenger services to there also ceased in 1964. East of Glazebrook there is the only passing loop east of Warrington, used regularly for late running fast trains to pass local services.

The station building, opened on 2 September 1873, is of typical Cheshire Lines Committee design. The ticket office is open weekday mornings only (07:10 -10:10). Although this station is not within the Greater Manchester area, it does mark the western boundary of the range of rail tickets produced by Transport for Greater Manchester.  Level access to the platform is available on the Liverpool-bound side; the opposite side is accessed via a long ramp but neither side is listed as step-free by National Rail Enquiries.

Services

Daytime services are roughly two hourly towards Birchwood and Liverpool Lime Street and two hourly towards Irlam and Manchester Oxford Road. Against the trend, evening services are in fact more frequent than during the day (roughly hourly, though most services run to/from Warrington Central only). There are additional peak services but no Sunday services (nearest stations with Sunday services are Irlam or Birchwood).

A summary of services is:

12 tpd towards Manchester Oxford Road
1 tpd towards Manchester Airport
13 tpd towards Liverpool Lime Street

See also
Listed buildings in Rixton-with-Glazebrook

References

Sources

External links

Railway stations in Warrington
DfT Category E stations
Former Cheshire Lines Committee stations
Railway stations in Great Britain opened in 1873
Northern franchise railway stations